"My Love" is a song by Europop duo London Boys, originally released in 1987 as a single in Germany. It was given another single release in the UK and Germany in 1989, following the song's inclusion on the duo's 1988 debut album The Twelve Commandments of Dance. "My Love" was written and produced by Ralf René Maué. The song reached No. 46 in the UK, but was a bigger success in Ireland where it reached No. 15.

Formats

1987
7" Single
"My Love" - 3:05
"My Love (Instrumental)" - 3:13

12" Single
"My Love (Extended Mix)" - 7:52
"My Love (Instrumental)" - 3:13

1989
7" Single/7" Picture Disc
"My Love" - 3:03
"Heartache" - 3:43

12" Single
"My Love (Remix)" - 3:03
"Heartache" - 3:43
"My Love (Extended Remix)" - 7:15

CD Single
"My Love (Extended Remix)" - 7:15
"Heartache" - 3:43
"My Love (Remix)" - 3:03

Chart performance

Personnel 
 Edem Ephraim - vocals
 Dennis Fuller - choreographer, backing vocals
 Ralf René Maué - producer
 Dave Ford - remixes

References

1987 songs
1987 singles
1989 singles
London Boys songs
Warner Music Group singles
Teldec singles
Songs written by Ralf René Maué